Aegomorphus nigricans is a species of beetle in the family Cerambycidae. It was described by Lameere in 1884.

References

Aegomorphus
Beetles described in 1884